Richard Pascal (born 5 November 1967) is a Caymanian former cyclist. He competed in two events at the 1988 Summer Olympics.

References

External links
 

1967 births
Living people
Caymanian male cyclists
Olympic cyclists of the Cayman Islands
Cyclists at the 1988 Summer Olympics
Place of birth missing (living people)